The Haitian−Qingdao railway or Haiqing railway is a railway in Shandong Province, China. The single-track railway connects  Station in Changyi on the Dezhou–Longkou–Yantai railway in northern Shandong with  Station in Gaomi on the Jiaozhou–Jinan railway near the Jiaozhou Bay in southern Shandong.

History
The railway had been expected to open by the end of 2012. However, it was delayed and was opened to freight on 31 December 2013. Passenger services were introduced to Pingdu West on 1 July 2015.

Passenger services

The line has a single passenger station, Pingdu West railway station. There are two services to and from Pingdu West per day. One terminates at Qingdao North while the other continues to Qingdao.

A new station, Pingdu railway station, on the Weifang–Laixi high-speed railway opened in November 2020 and is situated closer to the city.

See also
List of railways in China
Rail transport in the People's Republic of China

References

Railway lines in China
Rail transport in Shandong